Torino may refer to:

Places
Torino, Italian name of Turin, a major industrial city in northwestern Italy
Provincia di Torino, Italian for the Province of Turin
9523 Torino, an asteroid

People
 Torino Hunte (born 1990) Dutch soccer player

Sports
Torino 2006, 2006 Winter Olympics and Paralympics
Torino F.C., a football club based in Turin
Il Grande Torino, the highly successful 1940s football team, which perished at the Superga air disaster
Atlético Torino, a Peruvian football club based in Talara

Transportation and vehicles
Ford Torino, a car formerly built by the Ford Motor Company
IKA-Renault Torino, a car sold by Renault in Argentina

Entertainment
Torino (album), a 2002 album by Cinerama
Gran Torino, a 2008 film by Clint Eastwood, centered on the eponymous Ford Torino car

Facilities and structures
Torino Hut, a refuge in the Mont Blanc massif in the Aosta Valley, Italy
Torino Observatory, Turin, Italy; an astronomical observatory

Military
52 Motorised Division Torino, a division of the Italian Army in World War II
52nd Artillery Regiment "Torino", Italian army regiment
82nd Infantry Regiment "Torino", Italian army regiment

Other uses
Torino scale, used by astronomers to assess the potential danger of impact by near-Earth objects
Torino (typeface)
Torino, an alternative name for the Italian wine grape Dolcetto
Torino, a range of products from Swiss chocolate-maker Camille Bloch

See also

Torino 2006 (video game)
Tornio, a city in Finland

Turin (disambiguation)

tl:Torino